Olimpia Ippolita I Ludovisi (24 December 1663  – 29 December 1733) was the Princess of Piombino from 1701 until her death in 1733.

Life
She was born in Cagliari, the youngest daughter of Niccolò I Ludovisi, prince of Piombino, and Constanza Pamphilj, princess of San Martino and Alviano, sister of prince Camillo Pamphilj. On 19 October 1681 she married Gregorio II Boncompagni, 5th duke of Sora and Arce.

On 27 November 1700 she inherited the family fiefs from her sister Olimpia, including Piombino.

Ippolita was outlived by her five daughters. The Principality of Piombino was then inherited by the members of the Boncompagni family, through her eldest daughter Maria Eleonora.

Issue
 Hugo (1684–1686) died young
 Maria Eleonora (1686–1745), Princess of Piombino, married Antonio Boncompagni
 Constance (1687–1768), married  Vincenzo Giustiniani, Prince of Bassano
 Maria Teresa (1692–1744), married Urbano Barberini, Prince of Palestrina
 Giulia (1695–1751), married Marco Ottoboni, Duke of Fiano
 Anna Maria (1696–1752), married Gian Vincenzo Salviati, Duke of Giuliano

References
 Mauro Carrara, Signori e principi di Piombino, Bandecchi & Vivaldi, Pontedera 1996.

1663 births
1733 deaths
People from Cagliari
Ippolita
Princes of Piombino
17th-century Italian nobility
18th-century Italian nobility
17th-century women rulers
18th-century women rulers
17th-century Italian women
18th-century Italian women